Eunidia quadrialbovittata is a species of beetle in the family Cerambycidae. It was described by Stephan von Breuning in 1961. It is known from Ethiopia.

References

Endemic fauna of Ethiopia
Eunidiini
Beetles described in 1961